In Step is the fourth studio album by Stevie Ray Vaughan and Double Trouble released in 1989.  The title In Step can be seen as referring to Vaughan's new-found sobriety, following the years of drug and alcohol use that eventually led Vaughan into rehabilitation. It was also Vaughan's final album with Double Trouble, and also Vaughan's last album to be released during his lifetime. In 1990, he recorded a collaboration album with his brother, Jimmie Vaughan, called Family Style; later that year, Stevie Ray Vaughan died in a helicopter crash.

In 1999, a reissue of the album was released which contains an audio interview segment and four live bonus tracks.

Reception

Reviews for In Step have generally been positive. Robert Christgau rated the album an A−, signifying "a very good record." Although he stated that "Wall of Denial" and "Tightrope" fall into ex-addict jargon like it was natural speech and that "if the music was preachy or wimpy this would be a disaster," he concluded that "House Is Rockin'" keeps on boogieing on and that on the mood-jazz closer he escapes the blues undamaged for the first time in his career.

Lou Reed selected In Step as one of his 'picks of 1989'.

In a retrospective review, Stephen Thomas Erlewine of Allmusic rated In Step five out of five stars. He noted that before the album was released, "his songwriting was hit or miss. Even when he wrote a classic modern blues song, it was firmly within the genre's conventions." He further stated that it helped "Vaughan found his own songwriting voice, blending blues, soul, and rock in unique ways, and writing with startling emotional honesty." Although he stated that "tunes like the terse "Tightrope" and the dense "Wall of Denial" feel so intensely personal, it's hard to believe that they weren't the product of just one man", he also stated that "the lighter numbers [...] are just as effective as songs." He concluded that "it's fully realized, presenting every facet of Vaughan's musical personality, yet it still soars with a sense of discovery. It's a bittersweet triumph, given Vaughan's tragic death, [...] yet it's a triumph all the same."

Track listing

Original Release

1999 Reissue Bonus Tracks

The bonus tracks are all taken from recordings for Westwood One Radio.  "SRV Speaks" is from a studio interview with Timothy White.  The rest are all from recordings for the Superstar Concert Series broadcast.  The next three tracks are from Tingley Coliseum, Albuquerque on November 28, 1989.  The last is from McNichols Arena, Denver on November 29, 1989.

Personnel
Double Trouble
 Stevie Ray Vaughan – guitar, vocals
 Tommy Shannon – bass guitar
 Chris Layton – drums, percussion
 Reese Wynans – keyboards

Additional personnel
 Texacali Horns – on "Crossfire" and "Love Me Darlin'"
 Joe Sublett – saxophone
 Darrell Leonard – trumpet

Charts

Awards
Grammy Awards

Certifications

References

External links
 Sony Music - Stevie Ray Vaughan and Double Trouble - In Step

Stevie Ray Vaughan albums
1989 albums
Epic Records albums
Grammy Award for Best Contemporary Blues Album